Karl Siegmund von Seckendorff (26 November 1744 - 26 April 1785) was a German military officer, poet, and composer.

Life

He was born in Erlangen, Bavaria, the son of a Bavarian margrave and part of the Franconian aristocratic family Seckendorff. He served in the military from 1763 in Austria, and later in Prussia. In 1775 he became the chamberlain of Weimar where he joined the circle of Duchess Anna Amalia of Brunswick-Wolfenbüttel.

In Weimar, he supervised the Hofkapelle, and there began to pursue his literary and artistic ideas. He was especially inspired by Goethe, though Goethe thought little of his music. He translated The Sorrows of Young Werther into French, and enjoyed composing music for poems by Goethe, even before they were published, including Der König in Thule and Der Fischer. He published three collections called Volks- und andere Lieder (1779-1782). He wrote a music monodrama entitled Proserpina (produced in Weimar, 1778), whose success was due to Goethe.

Disappointed with his lack of success, in 1784, he moved to Ansbach to become the Prussian ambassador to the Franconian Circle.

Works

Texts
 Superba, libretto for Singspiel, composed by Ernst Wilhelm Wolf (Weimar, 1779)
 Das Rad des Schicksals, oder die Geschichte des Thoangesis (Dessau, 1783)
 Kalliste, Trauerspiel (Dessau 1783)

Musical settings
 Proserpina, Singspiel, (Weimar, 1778)
 Der Blumenraub (1784) (also libretto)

References 
 
 Constantin von Wurzbach. "Seckendorf, Karl Sigmund Freiherr von." In Biographisches Lexikon des Kaiserthums Oesterreich, vol. 33. Vienna: Verlag L. C. Zamarski, 1877, p. 268.
 
 Valentin Knab: Karl Siegmund von Seckendorff (1744–1785). Ein Beitrag zur Geschichte des deutschen volkstümlichen Liedes und der Musik am Weimarer Hof im 18. Jahrhundert (In: 60. Jahresbericht des Historischen Vereins für Mittelfranken, Ansbach 1914, S. 17–184)

1744 births
1785 deaths
People from Erlangen
German classical composers
Austrian military personnel of the Seven Years' War
Franconian nobility
People from the Electorate of Bavaria
18th-century classical composers
German male classical composers
Ambassadors of Prussia
18th-century German composers
18th-century German male musicians